Hatoyama (written: 鳩山, lit. dove mountain) may refer to:

People with the surname
 Hatoyama family, a prominent Japanese political family
Kazuo Hatoyama (1856–1911), academic and politician
Haruko Hatoyama (1861–1938), educator and political matriarch
Ichirō Hatoyama (1883–1959), politician and Prime Minister of Japan
Hideo Hatoyama (1884–1946), Japanese jurist
Kaoru Hatoyama (1888–1982), educator, administrator, and wife of Prime Minister Ichirō Hatoyama
Iichirō Hatoyama (1918–1993), politician and diplomat
Yasuko Hatoyama (1922–2013), wife of Iichirō, and mother of Kazuko, Yukio and Kunio
Yukio Hatoyama (born 1947), politician and Prime Minister of Japan
Kunio Hatoyama (1948–2016), politician
Emily Hatoyama (born 1955), Japanese actor and model

Other uses
 Hatoyama, Saitama (鳩山町; -machi), a town in Japan

See also
 Liberal Party–Hatoyama, a former Japanese political party

Japanese-language surnames